Dane Edward Johnson (born February 10, 1963) is an American former professional baseball coach and former pitcher. He played parts of three seasons in Major League Baseball (MLB) for the Chicago White Sox, Toronto Blue Jays, and Oakland Athletics.

Career
Johnson attended St. Thomas University and was drafted by the Blue Jays in the 2nd round of the 1984 amateur draft. He played at various levels of the minor league organization from 1984 to 1989. In 1990 he played for the Brother Elephants of the Chinese Professional Baseball League, and in 1991 he played for the Mercuries Tigers. He returned to minor league baseball in 1993, playing in the Milwaukee Brewers organization, starting with the Double-A El Paso Diablos and later with the Triple-A New Orleans Zephyrs. 

He made his major league debut in 1994 with the White Sox, and spent the entire 1995 season with their Triple-A affiliate, the Nashville Sounds. In 1996 Johnson returned to the Toronto organization, making a brief appearance with the Blue Jays and spending the rest of the season with the Triple-A Syracuse Chiefs. In 1997, Johnson made 38 relief appearances for the Oakland Athletics posting a 4–1 record. He split the 1998 season playing with the Blue Jays and Florida Marlins minor league organizations, and in 1999 he briefly pitched for the Albany-Colonie Diamond Dogs of the independent Northern League.

Johnson was named the Blue Jays' bullpen coach for the 2015 season, after serving as a roving minor league pitching instructor with the organization since 2004. The Blue Jays fired Johnson following the 2018 season.

He was named the pitching coach of the Omaha Storm Chasers prior to the 2020 season which ultimately was canceled due to the COVID-19 pandemic. He remained in the role when play resumed in 2021.

References

External links
, or CPBL

1963 births
Living people
Albany-Colonie Diamond Dogs players
American expatriate baseball players in Canada
American expatriate baseball players in Taiwan
Baseball players from Florida
Brother Elephants players
Charlotte Knights players
Chicago White Sox players
Dunedin Blue Jays players
El Paso Diablos players
Edmonton Trappers players
Florence Blue Jays players
Major League Baseball bullpen coaches
Major League Baseball pitchers
Medicine Hat Blue Jays players
Mercuries Tigers players
Myrtle Beach Blue Jays players
Nashville Sounds players
New Orleans Zephyrs players
Oakland Athletics players
Sportspeople from Coral Gables, Florida
St. Thomas Bobcats baseball players
Syracuse Chiefs players
Toronto Blue Jays coaches
Toronto Blue Jays players